Trushino is a rural locality (a village) and the administrative centre of Bikbausky Selsoviet, Zianchurinsky District, Bashkortostan, Russia. The population was 221 as of 2010. There are 4 streets.

Geography 
Trushino is located 19 km northeast of Isyangulovo (the district's administrative centre) by road. Karadygan is the nearest rural locality.

References 

Rural localities in Zianchurinsky District